is a former Japanese football player and currently assistant goalkeeper coach J1 League club of Yokohama FC.

Club career

Yokohama FC
Murai joined Yokohama-based Yokohama FC in 2011 from graduated from high school.

Yokohama FC Hong Kong
On 20 December 2012, Murai joined Hong Kong First Division League club Yokohama FC Hong Kong on loan from J2 League club Yokohama FC until the end of the season. He made his debut for his new club against Kitchee on 20 January 2013. His fine performance led the team gain a draw from the defending champions of the league.

On 4 July 2013, Yokohama FC confirms the extension of loan to Yokohama FC Hong Kong until 31 January 2014.

Club statistics

1Cup & Shield includes Hong Kong League Cup, Hong Kong Senior Challenge Shield and J.League Cup.

References

External links

  
 Taiki Murai at HKFA

1993 births
Living people
Association football people from Mie Prefecture
Japanese footballers
J2 League players
Hong Kong First Division League players
Yokohama FC players
Yokohama FC Hong Kong players
Ehime FC players
Association football goalkeepers